The Eastern Zone was one of the three regional zones of the 1972 Davis Cup.

11 teams entered the Eastern Zone, competing across 2 sub-zones. The winner of each sub-zones would play against each other to determine who would compete in the Inter-Zonal Zone against the winners of the Americas Zone and Europe Zone.

Australia defeated Japan in the Zone A final, and India defeated Malaysia in the Zone B final. In the Eastern Inter-Zonal final, Australia defeated India and progressed to the Inter-Zonal Zone.

Zone A

Draw

Quarterfinals
South Vietnam vs. Chinese Taipei

Hong Kong vs. Japan

Semifinals
South Korea vs. Australia

South Vietnam vs. Japan

Final
Japan vs. Australia

Zone B

Draw

Semifinals
India vs. Ceylon

Final
Malaysia vs. India

Eastern Inter-Zonal Final
India vs. Australia

References

External links
Davis Cup official website

Davis Cup Asia/Oceania Zone
Eastern Zone
Davis Cup
Davis Cup
Davis Cup
Davis Cup
Davis Cup
Davis Cup